Konni State assembly constituency is one of the 140 state legislative assembly constituencies in Kerala state in southern India. It is also one of the 7 state legislative assembly constituencies included in the Pathanamthitta Lok Sabha constituency. As of the 2021 Kerala Legislative Assembly election, the current MLA is K. U. Jenish Kumar of CPI(M).

Local self governed segments
Konni Niyamasabha constituency is composed of the following local self governed segments:

Members of Legislative Assembly
The following list contains all members of Kerala legislative assembly who have represented Konni Niyamasabha Constituency during the period of various assemblies:

Key

 * Bypoll

Election results
Percentage change (±%) denotes the change in the number of votes from the immediate previous election.

Niyamasabha Election 2021
There were 2,02,728 registered voters in Konni Constituency for the 2021 Kerala Niyama Sabha Election.

Niyamasabha By-election 2019
Due to the election of the sitting MLA Adoor Prakash as the MP from Attingal Lok Sabha constituency, Konni Niyamasabha Constituency went to bypoll in 2019. There were 1,97,956 registered voters in Konni Constituency for this election.

Niyamasabha Election 2016
There were 1,96,309 registered voters in Konni Constituency for the 2016 Kerala Niyamasabha Election.

Niyamasabha Election 2011 
There were 1,82,384 registered voters in the constituency for the 2011 election.

See also
 Konni
 Pathanamthitta district
 List of constituencies of the Kerala Legislative Assembly
 2016 Kerala Legislative Assembly election
 2019 Kerala Legislative Assembly by-elections

References 

Assembly constituencies of Kerala

State assembly constituencies in Pathanamthitta district